The Otamatea River is a river of the northwestern Hawke's Bay region of New Zealand's North Island. It flows generally north from its origins in the northern foothills of the Ahimanawa Range, reaching the Rangitaiki River 25 kilometres southwest of Taupo amid the Kaingaroa Forest.

References

Rivers of the Hawke's Bay Region
Rivers of New Zealand